Tip-cat (also called cat, cat and dog, one-a-cat, pussy, or piggy) is a pastime which consists of tapping a short billet of wood (usually no more than ) with a larger stick (similar to a baseball bat or broom handle); the shorter piece is tapered or sharpened on both ends so that it can be "tipped up" into the air when struck by the larger, at which point the player attempts to swing or hit it a distance with the larger stick while it is still in the air (similar to swinging at a pitch in baseball or cricket, etc.).

There are many varieties of the game, but in the most common, the batter, having placed the billet, or "cat", in a small circle on the ground, tips it into the air and hits it to a distance. His opponent then offers him a certain number of points, based upon his estimate of the number of hops or jumps necessary to cover the distance. If the batter thinks the distance underestimated he is at liberty to decline the offer and measure the distance in jumps, and score the number made.

In popular culture 
Italo Calvino has written a short story "Making Do" (in English, "Chi si contenta" in Italian), published in the collection Numbers in the Dark and Other Stories in which the only thing left legal for the citizens to do is to play tip-cat (Lippa in the Italian), which they do all day, until even that is forbidden them, too. A variant of the Italian 'lippa' is 'lizza'.

Variations

In Walsall in the 1950s, an alternative version required a set of stumps and bails, similar to those used in cricket; unlike cricket, these stumps were leant against a convenient wall, as the game was played in the street. The aim was to tip up the cat and then strike it towards the stumps with the object of dislodging the bails. Opposing fielders were allowed to catch the cat in flight.

Gillidanda in southern Europe and the Indian subcontinent

Mazza e pivezo in the language of Naples, southern Italy 

Țurca in Romania and Moldavia

Cead, or Cleas na Slise in Ireland

Jachigi in South Korea.

Alak Dolak in Iran.

Knurr and Spell in West Yorkshire.

Dainty, a local variation of this game played in the Louisville neighborhood of Germantown-Schnitzelburg

Nipsi in Pennsylvania Dutch communities.

See also
 Giddy-gaddy
 British folk sports
Dandi biyo

References

Outdoor games